The Northlands Denesuline First Nation is a First Nations band government in northwestern Manitoba, Canada. This Dene or Denesuline population were part of a larger group once called the "Caribou-eaters".

The community of Lac Brochet or Dahlu T’ua() ('Jackfish Lake') is the administrative centre of the Northlands First Nation. Seven-hundred-twenty residents of Lac Brochet chose Dene as their mother tongue in 2011. English was spoken by most of the population.

Territory
The territories of the First Nation include five parcels of land: 
Sheth Chok — with  
Thuycholeeni — with  
Thuycholeeni Aze — with  
Tthekale Nu — with

Membership
As of February 2013 the total membership of Northland First Nation was 1,024 with 868 members living on-reserve and 156 members living off-reserve.

The First Nation is governed by a Chief and six councillors  and is affiliated with the Keewatin Tribal Council. The Keewatin Tribal Council with its head office in Thompson represents eleven First Nations in Northern Manitoba.

See also
Denesuline language
Denesuline

References

External links
 Northlands First Nation
 Lac Brochet
 Map of Lac Brochet 197A at Statcan

Keewatin Tribal Council
First Nations governments in Manitoba
Dene governments

First Nations in Northern Region, Manitoba